Angiotensin-converting enzyme 2 (ACE2) is an enzyme that can be found either attached to the membrane of cells (mACE2) in the intestines, kidney, testis, gallbladder, and heart or in a soluble form (sACE2). Both membrane bound and soluble ACE2 are integral parts of the renin–angiotensin–aldosterone system (RAAS) that exists to keep the body's blood pressure in check. While mACE2 does not appear to factor into the harmful phase of RAAS (the increase of blood pressure), its existence is vital in order for the enzyme ADAM17 to cleave its extracellular domain to create soluble ACE2 (sACE2). Soluble ACE2 lowers blood pressure by catalyzing the hydrolysis of angiotensin II (a vasoconstrictor peptide) into angiotensin (1–7)  (a vasodilator) which in turns binds to MasR receptors creating localized vasodilation and hence decreasing blood pressure. This decrease in blood pressure makes the entire process a promising drug target for treating cardiovascular diseases.

mACE2 also serves as the entry point into cells for some coronaviruses, including  HCoV-NL63, SARS-CoV, and SARS-CoV-2. The SARS-CoV-2 spike protein itself is known to damage the endothelium via downregulation of ACE2. The human version of the enzyme can be referred to as hACE2.

Structure 

Membrane bound Angiotensin-converting enzyme 2 (mACE2) is a zinc-containing metalloenzyme located on the surface of intestinal enterocytes, renal tubular cells and other cells. mACE2 protein contains an N-terminal peptidase M2 domain and a C-terminal collectrin renal amino acid transporter domain.

mACE2 is a single-pass type I membrane protein, with its enzymatically active domain exposed on the surface of cells in the intestines and other tissues. The extracellular domain of mACE2 can be cleaved from the transmembrane domain by another enzyme known as ADAM17 a member of the sheddase enzyme family, during the protective phase of RAAS, the Renin Angiotension Aldosterone System which regulates our body's blood pressure. The resulting cleaved protein is known as soluble ACE2 or sACE2. It is released into the bloodstream where one of sACE2's functions is to turn excess angiotensin II into angiotensin 1-7 which binds to MasR receptors creating localized vasodilation and hence decreasing blood pressure. Excess sACE2 may ultimately be excreted in the urine.

Location within the human body  
mACE2 is attached to the cell membrane of mainly enterocytes of the small intestine and duodenum, proximal tubular cells of the kidneys, glandular cells of the gallbladder, as well as Sertoli cells and Leydig cells of the testis. The expression profile of mACE2 in the human body was recently thoroughly evaluated by the Human Protein Atlas team using a large-scale multiomics approach combining several different methods for analysis of gene expression, including a stringent immunohistochemical analysis using two independent antibodies. In addition to the above-mentioned issues, mACE2 expression was also seen in endothelial cells and pericytes of blood vessels within certain tissues, cardiomyocytes in heart tissue, and a smaller subset of cells within the thyroid gland, epididymis, seminal vesicle, pancreas, liver and placenta. Despite the fact that the respiratory system is the primary route of SARS-CoV-2 infection, very limited expression is seen, both at protein and mRNA level. The expression within the respiratory system is mainly restricted to the upper bronchial and nasal epithelia, especially in the ciliated cells.

Function 
As part of the renin–angiotensin–aldosterone system (RAAS) protective phase, soluble ACE2's (sACE2) important function is to act as a counterbalance to the angiotensin-converting enzyme (ACE). ACE cleaves angiotensin I hormone into the vasoconstricting  angiotensin II which causes a cascade of hormonal reactions which is part of the body's harmful phase of RAAS, which ultimately leads to an increase in the body's blood pressure.  ACE2 has an opposing effect to ACE, degrading angiotensin II into angiotensin (1-7), thereby lowering blood pressure.

sACE2, as part of RAAS's protective phase, cleaves the carboxyl-terminal amino acid phenylalanine from angiotensin II (Asp-Arg-Val-Tyr-Ile-His-Pro-Phe) and hydrolyses it into the vasodilator angiotensin (1-7) (H-Asp-Arg-Val-Tyr-Ile-His-Pro-OH), which binds to Mas Receptors and ultimately leads to a decrease in blood pressure.  sACE2 can also cleave numerous peptides, including , apelin, neurotensin, dynorphin A, and ghrelin.

mACE2 also regulates the membrane trafficking of the neutral amino acid transporter SLC6A19 and has been implicated in Hartnup's disease.

Research in mice has shown that ACE2 (whether it is the membrane bound version or soluble is inconclusive) is involved in regulation of the blood glucose level but its mechanism is yet to be confirmed.

Coronavirus entry point 
As a transmembrane protein, mACE2 serves as the main entry point into cells for some coronaviruses, including HCoV-NL63, SARS-CoV (the virus that causes SARS), and SARS-CoV-2 (the virus that causes COVID-19).  More specifically, the binding of the spike S1 protein of SARS-CoV and SARS-CoV-2 to the enzymatic domain of mACE2 on the surface of cells results in endocytosis and translocation of both the virus and the enzyme into endosomes located within cells. In culture blocking endocytosis traps the virus on the surface. 

The binding of the SARS-CoV-2 virus through mACE2 receptors present in heart tissue may be responsible for direct viral injury leading to myocarditis. In a study done during the SARS outbreak, SARS virus RNA was ascertained in the autopsy of heart specimens in 35% of the patients who died due to SARS. It was also observed that an already diseased heart has increased expression of mACE2 receptors contrasted to healthy individuals. This entry process also requires priming of the S protein by the host serine protease TMPRSS2, the inhibition of which is under current investigation as a potential therapeutic. It has also been shown that disruption of S-protein glycosylation significantly impairs viral entry, indicating the importance of glycan-protein interactions in the process.

This has led some to hypothesize that decreasing the levels of mACE2, in cells, might help in fighting the infection.  Furthermore, according to studies conducted on mice, the interaction of the spike protein of the coronavirus with mACE2 induces a drop in the levels of mACE2 in cells through internalization and degradation of the protein and hence may contribute to lung damage.

On the other hand, sACE2 has been shown to have a protective effect against virus-induced lung injury by increasing the production of the vasodilator angiotensin 1–7. Furthermore, some researchers have hypothesized that sACE2 (which is created during the Protective Phase of RAAS) is not only involved in binding to Angiotensin II to create Angiotensin I-7 which lowers blood pressure by vasodilation, but that free and soluble ACE2 may also be binding to coronavirus spike proteins, hence making those coronavirus spikes unavailable for binding to mACE-2 sites. But even with only tiny amounts of mACE2, SARS-CoV-2 virus can gain entry into cells if TMPRSS2 is present.

Both ACE inhibitors and angiotensin II receptor blockers (ARBs) that are used to treat high blood pressure have been shown in rodent studies to upregulate mACE2 expression, possibly affecting the severity of coronavirus infections.

However, a systematic review and meta-analysis published on July 11, 2012, found that "use of ACE inhibitors was associated with a significant 34% reduction in risk of pneumonia compared with controls." Moreover, "the risk of pneumonia was also reduced in patients treated with ACE inhibitors who were at higher risk of pneumonia, in particular those with stroke and heart failure. Use of ACE inhibitors was also associated with a reduction in pneumonia related mortality, although the results were less robust than for overall risk of pneumonia."  An April 2020 study of patients hospitalized in Hubei Province in China found a death rate of 3.7% for patients with hypertension who were taking ACE inhibitors or ARBs. The death rate was compared with 9.8% of hospitalized patients with hypertension not taking such drugs, suggesting that ACE inhibitors and ARBs are not harmful and may help against the coronavirus.

Despite lack of conclusive evidence, some have advocated for and against the cessation of ACE inhibitor or ARB treatment in COVID-19 patients with hypertension. However, multiple professional societies and regulatory bodies have recommended continuing standard ACE inhibitor and ARB therapy.

Plasma ACE2 levels predict outcome of COVID-19 in hospitalized patients, with higher plasma levels being correlated with worse disease outcomes. Patients with high blood pressure or heart disease show elevated ACE2 plasma levels.

Given its role as the SARS-CoV-2 entry receptor, it has been repeatedly hypothesised that population variation in ACE2 may contribute to an individual's genetic susceptibility to COVID-19. Several studies have reported that ACE2 missense variants can alter its binding affinity for the Spike protein, and consequently its susceptibility to SARS-CoV-2 pseudovirus entry, and there is strong evidence of individuals who carry rare variants in ACE2 that could confer total resistance to SARS-CoV-2 infection. The expression level of ACE2 at the cell surface is another critical factor affecting viral susceptibility and probably plays a role in the tissue tropism of the virus and many suspected COVID-19 associated ACE2 variants affect expression. For example, genetic variants placed in the X chromosome (rs190509934:C) have been related to lower expression levels of ACE2 enzyme. This would lead to an increased number of entries and infections performed by the SARS-CoV-2 virus. Moreover, those variants have shown a 37% reduction in expression of the protein and a remarkable protection from severe outcomes (respiratory failure and death).

Recombinant human ACE2 

Recombinant human ACE2 (rhACE2) is surmised to be a novel therapy for acute lung injury, and appeared to improve pulmonary blood flow and oxygen saturation in piglets with a lipopolysaccharide-induced acute respiratory distress syndrome. The half-life of rhACE2 in human beings is about 10 hours, and the onset of action is 30 minutes in addition to the course of effect (duration) of 24 hours.  Several findings suggest that rhACE2 may be a promising drug for those with intolerance to classic renin-angiotensin system inhibitors (RAS inhibitors) or in diseases where circulating angiotensin II is elevated.

An in vitro study focused on the early stages of infection found that clinical-grade human recombinant soluble ACE2 (hrsACE2) reduced SARS-CoV-2 recovery from vero cells by a factor of 1,000-5,000. The equivalent mouse rsACE2 did not have such an effect. This study suggests that rhsACE2 not only restores the renin-angiotensin system to balance as in the earlier ARDS studies, but also directly slows down infection by this virus – possibly as a decoy. ACE2 mutants have been engineered with even higher affinity for SARS-CoV-2 Spike and shown to effectively neutralise the virus in vitro. An ACE2 triple mutant that displayed nanomolar binding to Spike (sACE2.v2.4), was later shown to block pseudovirus cell entry in human lung cell lines and prevent SARS-CoV-2 induced ARDS in an ACE2 humanized mouse model.

Infused rhACE2 has been evaluated in clinical trials for the treatment of acute respiratory distress syndrome (ARDS). rhACE2 is in phase II trial for severe COVID-19.

See also 
 Renin–angiotensin system
 Angiotensin-converting enzyme
 SARS-CoV-2 § Structural biology
 LRRC15

References

External links 
 
 Angiotensin-converting enzyme 2 in Membranome database
 3D structure of complex of a neurotransmitter sodium symporter B(0)AT1, ACE2, and SARS-CoV-2  receptor-binding domain in OPM database
 

EC 3.4.17
Single-pass transmembrane proteins